Tracey Thayer Bernett (born 1955) is an American politician who served as a member of the Colorado House of Representatives from the 12th district. Elected in November 2020, she assumed office on January 13, 2021. On January 9, 2023 she resigned due to rising legal issues related to her declared place of residence.

Education 
Bernett earned a Bachelor of Science degree in civil engineering from Cornell University and a Master of Business Administration from Harvard Business School.

Career 
From 1993 to 2008, Bernett operated her own business in the computer storage industry. She also worked as a civil engineer and served as a policy analyst for Faith Winter and Mike Foote. In the November 2020 election for a seat in the Colorado House of Representatives, Bernett defeated Republican nominee Eric Davila. She assumed office on January 13, 2021.

2022 fraud charges
On November 4, 2022, Boulder County District Attorney Michael Dougherty filed three felony and two misdemeanor fraud charges against Bernett claiming she lied about residing in an apartment she rented for residency purposes. Following 2020 redistricting, Bernett's Longmont residence moved from house district 12 to district 19. The DA says Bernett then rented an apartment in Louisville, Colorado, which remained in district 12. The charges allege that she transferred her residence and voter registration to the apartment and filed false sworn statements with the office of the Secretary of State affirming that she resided in the apartment, even though she never really lived there. The district attorney is also charging her with misrepresenting her residence by voting in a primary election in a district she didn't live in.

Bennett resigned from the Colorado General Assembly on the eve of the beginning of the legislation session.

On February 10, 2023, as part of a plea deal, Bernett pleaded guilty to a class-four felony, attempt to influence a public servant and a class-one misdemeanor, perjury. Three other charges — two felonies and one misdemeanor — were dismissed as part of the deal. Bernett received a two-year deferred judgement and sentence for the felony, which includes 150 hours of community service. The court will not enter the felony charge if she successfully completes the deferred judgment and sentence, but the misdemeanor will remain on her record.

Personal life 
Bernett and her husband, Frank Bernett, have two children and live in Longmont, Colorado.

References 

Living people
1955 births
Cornell University alumni
Harvard Business School alumni
People from Longmont, Colorado
Women state legislators in Colorado
Democratic Party members of the Colorado House of Representatives
21st-century American politicians
21st-century American women politicians